Edward Morris  (born 1872) was a Welsh international footballer. He was part of the Wales national football team, playing 3 matches. He played his first match on 13 March 1893 against England and his last match on 5 April 1893 against Ireland.

See also
 List of Wales international footballers (alphabetical)
 List of Wales international footballers born outside Wales

References

1872 births
Welsh footballers
Wales international footballers
Place of birth missing
Year of death missing
Association footballers not categorized by position
Date of death missing